The 2020 Worlds Collide was the second Worlds Collide professional wrestling livestreaming event produced by WWE. It was held for wrestlers from the promotion's NXT and NXT UK brand divisions. The event aired exclusively on the WWE Network and took place on January 25, 2020, at the Toyota Center in Houston, Texas.

Six matches were contested at the event, including one on the Kickoff pre-show. In the main event, NXT UK's Imperium (Walter, Fabian Aichner, Marcel Barthel, and Alexander Wolfe) defeated NXT's The Undisputed Era (Adam Cole, Kyle O'Reilly, Bobby Fish, and Roderick Strong) in an eight-man tag team  match.

Production

Background 
Worlds Collide is a series of professional wrestling shows that began on January 26, 2019, when WWE held an interbrand tournament featuring wrestlers from their NXT, NXT UK, and 205 Live brands. The "Worlds Collide" name was subsequently adopted for a WWE Network series that aired in April 2019. During the Royal Rumble 2020 weekend announcements, WWE revealed that a second Worlds Collide event would air live on the WWE Network on January 25, 2020, and held at the Toyota Center in Houston, Texas, though unlike the previous year's event, it would only feature the NXT and NXT UK brands and not also 205 Live. Also unlike the 2019 event, there was not a Worlds Collide Tournament with a future championship opportunity at stake. Instead, the card's matches were interbrand matches pitting wrestlers from NXT against those from NXT UK.

Storylines 

The card included six matches that resulted from scripted storylines, where wrestlers portrayed villains, heroes, or less distinguishable characters in scripted events that built tension and culminated in a wrestling match or series of matches, with results predetermined by WWE's writers on the NXT and NXT UK brands. Storylines were produced on the WWE NXT and NXT UK television programs.

Event

Pre-Show 
On the pre-show, Mia Yim took on Kay Lee Ray. In the end, Ray rolled up Yim while grabbing the ropes to win.

Preliminary matches 
The actual pay-per-view opened with Ilja Dragunov facing Finn Bálor. In the end, Bálor performed the 1916 DDT to win the match.

Next, Angel Garza defended the NXT Cruiserweight Championship against Isaiah "Swerve" Scott, Jordan Devlin and Travis Banks in a fatal 4-Way match. In the end, Garza performed the Wing Clipper on Scott, however, Devlin broke up the pin by delivering a headbutt to Garza and threw him out of the ring. Devlin then performed the Devlin Side on Scott and pinned him to win the championship for the first time.

After that, Moustache Mountain (Trent Seven and Tyler Bate) faced 	DIY (Johnny Gargano and Tommaso Ciampa). In the end, Ciampa and Gargano performed their old tag finisher, Meeting in the Middle (running knee smash/superkick combo) on Seven to win the match. After the match, both teams shook hands and hugged, with Ciampa and Gargano raising Bate's and Seven's hands afterward.

The penultimate match was Rhea Ripley defending the NXT Women's Championship against Toni Storm. In the end, after Storm missed the Frog splash, Ripley performed the Riptide to retain the championship.

Main event
In the main event, Imperium (NXT UK Champion Walter, Fabian Aichner, Marcel Barthel, and Alexander Wolfe) defeated The Undisputed Era (NXT Champion Adam Cole, NXT Tag Team Champions Kyle O'Reilly and Bobby Fish, and Roderick Strong) in an eight-man tag team match despite being outnumbered 4-3 after Wolfe suffered an injury early in the match.

Aftermath
A Worlds Collide event was not held in 2021, but it was announced to return in 2022. The 2022 event was also the first Worlds Collide event to air on Peacock after the American version of the WWE Network merged under Peacock in March 2021.

Results

References

External links
 

2020 WWE Network events
2020 in Texas
Events in Houston
Professional wrestling in Houston
January 2020 events in the United States
WWE NXT
NXT UK
2020